Ludwigia hexapetala, the water primrose, is a herbaceous perennial plant of the family Onagraceae. Native to Central and South America, its habitat includes the margins of lakes, ponds, ditches, and streams.  Its stems may be immersed or fully emergent. It is a noxious invader of aquatic ecosystems in North America.

Habitat
Ludwigia hexapetala is native to Latin America. It occurs naturally in swampier regions, such as those of lakes, ponds, and other areas of low intensity/stagnant water. It grows in mats of up to three feet tall, and in doing so, it crowds and/or shades out the other, more native species. The plant is known to inhabit the Southeast United States, Midwest United States, Pacific Coast, and parts of New England

External resources

http://www.ecy.wa.gov/programs/wq/plants/plantid2/descriptions/ludhex.html
https://web.archive.org/web/20050814081017/http://www.nwcb.wa.gov/weed_info/Written_findings/Ludwigia_hexapetala.html
http://www.patentlens.net/daisy/AgroTran/g8/821.html
https://web.archive.org/web/20130603161101/http://www.fairchildgarden.org/uploads/docs/Education/Downloadable_teaching_modules/plant%20kingdom/monocot%20and%20dicot%20characteristics%20handout.pdf

hexapetala